"Eres Mía" ("You Are Mine") is a song performed and written by American singer Romeo Santos for his second studio album Formula, Vol. 2 (2014). Sony Music Latin released the song as the fourth single from Formula, Vol. 2.

Charts

Weekly charts

Year-end charts

Decade-end charts

Certifications

See also
List of Billboard number-one Latin songs of 2014

References 

2014 singles
Bachata songs
Romeo Santos songs
Songs written by Romeo Santos
Spanish-language songs
Sony Music Latin singles
2014 songs
Number-one singles in the Dominican Republic